Sweers Island is an island in the South Wellesley Islands in the Gulf of Carpentaria, Queensland, Australia. Privately owned via a perpetual lease and with the only residents being the owners and workers at the resort, the island is within the Shire of Mornington.

It lies within the traditional lands of the Kaiadilt people, and was the location of "The Investigator Tree" which is now in Queensland Museum.

History

Kayardild (also known as Kaiadilt and Gayadilta) is a language of the Gulf of Carpentaria, once spoken by the Kaiadilt people. The Kayardild language region includes the landscape within the local government boundaries of the Mornington Shire Council.

The island was given its European name by explorer Matthew Flinders on 16 November 1802 after Salomon Sweers, a council member of the East India Company at Batavia who was one of those who instructed Abel Tasman to explore the Gulf of Carpentaria in 1644. Flinders was circumnavigating the Australian continent in the sloop HMS Investigator to map the coastline and establish if Australia was a single island or whether there were two or more islands (the Gulf of Carpentaria and the Great Australian Bight were suspected to be the entrances to straits between the islands).

Robert Towns established Burketown in 1865 as a base for his extensive holdings in the Gulf Country. Burketown's development was limited due to the extent of tropical diseases suffered by its inhabitants. When the ship Margaret and Mary arrived in Burketown from Sydney carrying a fever (possibly typhoid), the majority of those on board died at Burketown. In the belief that Burketown was inherently unhealthy, William Landsborough evacuated most of the survivors to Sweers Island for 18 months, with only a further two people dying. Towns and Co then traded wool, tallow, hides and skins between Sweers Island and Batavia in October 1868.

Thomas ("Tex") and Lyn Battle took over the perpetual lease of the island in around 1988.

The Investigator Tree

In 1841, the island was visited by John Lort Stokes, commander of the Beagle on an exploration of northern Australia. Stokes discovered a tree (Celtis paniculata) on the western part of the island with the word "Investigator" carved into it by Flinders on his 1802 visit, giving the tree the name "The Investigator Tree". Stokes also carved the name "Beagle" on the tree. Subsequent visitors to the island also carved names, including from Augustus Charles Gregory's expedition in 1856 and Landsborough's search for the Burke and Wills expedition in 1861. A cyclone on 5 March 1887 severely damaged the tree, so part of the trunk was removed to the Queensland Museum in 1889.

Geography and governance

The island lies within the Shire of Mornington.

Recreation
Recreational activities on Sweers Island include fishing and watching wildlife. Sweetlip is the most common table fish caught off the island, while other fish species include: coral trout, red emperor, golden snapper, nannygai and parrot fish. In winter fish species including Spanish mackerel, grey mackerel, giant trevally, giant leatherskin, queenfish, northern bluefin tuna, and cobia can be caught.

Accommodation, meals and boats are available at the Sweers Island Resort.

Transport
The island has a  all-weather gravel airstrip, owned by the resort.

See also

List of islands of Australia

References

External links

 Museum entry for The Investigator Tree with photo

Islands of Queensland
Shire of Mornington (Queensland)
Gulf of Carpentaria